Paul Metzner was a German figure skater who competed in men's singles and pair skating.

With Margarete Metzner, he won the bronze medal at the 1922 World Figure Skating Championships in pairs skating.

Competitive highlights

Pairs 
With  Margarete Klebe / Margarete Metzner

References 

German male single skaters
German male pair skaters
Date of birth missing
Date of death missing
20th-century German people